Dean Lance O'Gorman (born 1 December 1976) is a New Zealand actor, artist, and photographer. He played the dwarf Fíli in the Hobbit trilogy and the Norse God Bragi/Anders Johnson in the fantasy series The Almighty Johnsons. He also portrayed Kirk Douglas in Trumbo (2015).

Early life
O'Gorman was born in Auckland, New Zealand, to parents Lance, a landscape painter, and Christine O'Gorman. He has a younger brother, Brett, who is also an actor as well as a comedian. He has Irish and English ancestry; his maternal grandfather was an English paratrooper in the Second World War.

O'Gorman earned a black belt in karate by the age of ten, and attended Rangitoto College in Auckland. He initially planned to study graphic design.

Career

Film

At 12 years old, O'Gorman was discovered by a casting agent during a school speech competition. After acting in a number of television roles and the Australian film The Rogue Stallion, he got a starring role in 1995 teen romance Bonjour Timothy, a performance which earned him a nomination for Best Actor at the Giffoni Film Festival in Italy.

Subsequent roles included co-starring as Mark in ensemble drama When Love Comes and playing opposite Melanie Lynskey in road movie Snakeskin, the latter of which received five awards at the 2001 New Zealand Film and Television Awards.

In April 2011, O'Gorman was cast as the Dwarf Fili in Peter Jackson's three-part film adaptation of The Hobbit. He later made a cameo appearance in an advertisement for Air New Zealand.

In Jay Roach's 2015 film Trumbo, O'Gorman plays the part of Kirk Douglas, including a re-creation of filming the movie Spartacus.  He plays a demoralized writer in the 2017 film Pork Pie, winning praise at Cannes.

Television

O'Gorman began acting in television in the early 1990s. His career took off in the middle of the decade, when he won the role of Harry Martin in popular New Zealand soap opera Shortland Street and appeared in locally-shot shows Hercules: The Legendary Journeys and Xena: Warrior Princess multiple times. O'Gorman also held a regular role as Iolaus in the short-lived Young Hercules opposite Ryan Gosling, and in Australian hit McLeod's Daughters, as Luke Morgan, a love interest of Jodi Fountain McLeod.

He has made multiple guest appearances on several television shows including The Cult, Go Girls and Legend of the Seeker. From 2011 to 2013, O'Gorman played the role of Anders Johnson in New Zealand fantasy series The Almighty Johnsons. He played mountaineer George Lowe in 2016 mini-series Hillary.

Art and photography
In addition to acting, O'Gorman is also a photographer and artist. In an interview with Tom Cardy, he confessed to difficult times finding work during his first year in Los Angeles. He was almost broke, but was soon discovered by his friend's agent and thus began to receive more work, dividing his time among painting, photography and acting.

In June 2012, he held his first exhibition at the Page Blackie Gallery in Wellington, New Zealand. The theme of the exhibition focused on the Vietnam War. In order to obtain accuracy in his work, O'Gorman sought the advice of a New Zealand Vietnam veteran. Preferring to dress and set up shoots himself, the models for this gallery included other cast members from The Hobbit: An Unexpected Journey and The Almighty Johnsons. O'Gorman's photographs were also displayed at the 2015 Berlin B3 Biennial.

Personal life
O'Gorman married his long-time girlfriend Sarah Wilson in January 2016.

In May 2019, his daughter was born.

Filmography

Film

Television

References

External links
 Dean O'Gorman's official photography website
 
 

1976 births
20th-century New Zealand male actors
21st-century New Zealand male actors
Living people
New Zealand artists
New Zealand male film actors
New Zealand male soap opera actors
New Zealand male television actors
New Zealand people of English descent
New Zealand people of Irish descent
New Zealand photographers
People educated at Rangitoto College
Photographers from Auckland